The 2022 Coppa Italia Final decided the winners of the 2021–22 Coppa Italia, the 75th season of Italy's premier football cup, the Coppa Italia. It was played on 11 May 2022 between Juventus and Internazionale.

Internazionale won the match 4–2 after extra time for their eighth Coppa Italia title. As winners, they qualified for the 2022 Supercoppa Italiana against the champions of the 2021–22 Serie A.

Background
This was the third Derby d'Italia in a Coppa Italia final, after 1959 and 1965, both won by Juventus. This was the fourth derby of the 2021–22 season, with one league draw and two wins for Internazionale, including the 2021 Supercoppa Italiana.

Road to the final
Note: In all results below, the score of the finalist is given first (H: home; A: away).

Match

Details

See also
2021–22 Coppa Italia
2022–23 UEFA Europa League
2022 Supercoppa Italiana
List of Coppa Italia finals

Notes

References

Coppa Italia Finals
Coppa Italia Final 2022
Coppa Italia Final 2022
Coppa Italia Final
Coppa Italia Final
Football in Rome